Sughdiyon (formerly Pakhtakoron, and Homid Aliyev) is a town and jamoat in north-western Tajikistan. It is located in Zafarobod District in Sughd Region. The jamoat includes the town Homid Aliev and the village Chashmasor. It has a total population of 11,500 (2020).

References

Populated places in Sughd Region
Jamoats of Tajikistan